The Anyue gas field is a natural gas field located in central Sichuan basin. It was discovered in 2014 and developed by Sinopec. It began production in 2014 and produces natural gas and condensates. The total proven reserves of the Anyue gas field are around 15.4 trillion cubic feet (440 km³), and production is slated to be around 383 million cubic feet/day (11×105m³).

References

Natural gas fields in China